Nicolas Devir Claxton (born April 17, 1999) is an American professional basketball player for the Brooklyn Nets of the National Basketball Association (NBA). He played college basketball for the Georgia Bulldogs.

High school career
Claxton attended Legacy Charter School in Greenville, South Carolina. In his senior season, he averaged 17.4 points,7.8 rebounds and 2.9 blocks per game and became the fourth player in school history to record 1,000 career points. Claxton was a three-star recruit and chose to play for Georgia over Baylor, Florida State, NC State, and South Carolina.

Professional career

Brooklyn Nets (2019–present) 
On June 20, 2019, Claxton was selected with the 31st overall pick in the 2019 NBA draft by the Brooklyn Nets. On July 7, 2019, the Nets announced that they had signed Claxton. He made his NBA debut on November 8, recording eight points and six rebounds in a 119–115 win over the Portland Trail Blazers. Claxton suffered a hamstring injury in January 2020 and was assigned to the Nets' NBA G League affiliate, the Long Island Nets, on January 10. On January 20, he scored a season-high 15 points, alongside four rebounds and two assists, in a 111–117 loss to the Philadelphia 76ers. On June 24, the Nets announced that Claxton had undergone successful arthroscopic labrum repair surgery on his left shoulder and was expected to miss the remainder of the 2019–20 season.

On May 12, 2021, Claxton scored a season-high 18 points, alongside five rebounds and two blocks, in a 128–116 win over the San Antonio Spurs. During the playoffs, the Nets faced the Boston Celtics in the first round. Claxton made his playoff debut on May 22, recording six points and five rebounds in a 104–93 Game 1 win. The Nets ended up winning the series in five games, but lost to the Milwaukee Bucks in seven games during the second round.

On February 2, 2022, Claxton scored a season-high 23 points, alongside eleven rebounds and five blocks, in a 101–112 loss to the Sacramento Kings. In a rematch of last year's series, the Nets faced the Boston Celtics in the first round of the playoffs. The Nets were eliminated in four games, with Claxton averaging 10.5 points and 2.3 blocks per game.

On July 7, 2022, Claxton re-signed with the Nets on a two-year, $20 millon contract. He was the Nets' starting center entering the 2021–22 season. On January 26, 2023, Claxton scored a career-high 27 points, alongside 13 rebounds and two blocks, in a 122–130 loss to the Detroit Pistons.

National team career
In 2014, Claxton played for the United States Virgin Islands at the Centrobasket Under-15 Championship in Panama City, averaging a double-double of 10.6 points and 11.8 rebounds per game. He made another appearance for the Virgin Islands at the 2015 Centrobasket Under-17 Championship in San Juan, Puerto Rico, where he averaged 11 points and eight rebounds per game. Claxton competed at the 2016 FIBA Americas Under-18 Championship in Valdivia, Chile. He averaged a team-high 12 points and 7.2 rebounds per game, leading his team to seventh place. In the summer of 2018, Claxton joined the senior Virgin Islands national team at qualifying competition for the 2019 FIBA World Cup.

Claxton is eligible for the U.S. Virgin Islands team because his father, Charles, was born in St. Thomas.

Career statistics

NBA

Regular season

|-
| style="text-align:left;"| 
| style="text-align:left;"| Brooklyn
| 15 || 0 || 12.5 || .563 || .143 || .524 || 2.9 || 1.1 || .1 || .5 || 4.4
|-
| style="text-align:left;"| 
| style="text-align:left;"| Brooklyn
| 32 || 1 || 18.6 || .621 || .200 || .484 || 5.2 || .9 || .7 || 1.3 || 6.6
|-
| style="text-align:left;"| 
| style="text-align:left;"| Brooklyn
| 47 || 19 || 20.7 || .674 ||  || .581 || 5.6 || .9 || .5 || 1.1 || 8.7
|- class="sortbottom"
| style="text-align:center;" colspan="2"| Career
| 94 || 20 || 18.7 || .646 || .167 || .539 || 5.0 || .9 || .5 || 1.1 || 7.3

Playoffs

|-
| style="text-align:left;"| 2021
| style="text-align:left;"| Brooklyn
| 12 || 0 || 10.8 || .483 || — || .667 || 2.8 || .6 || .3 || 1.0 || 2.5
|-
| style="text-align:left;"| 2022
| style="text-align:left;"| Brooklyn
| 4 || 0 || 24.5 || .792 || — || .182 || 6.3 || 1.5 || 1.3 || 2.3 || 10.5
|- class="sortbottom"
| style="text-align:center;" colspan="2"| Career
| 16 || 0 || 14.3 || .623 || — || .240 || 3.6 || .8 || .6 || 1.3 || 4.5

College

|-
| style="text-align:left;"| 2017–18
| style="text-align:left;"| Georgia
| 33 || 5 || 14.7 || .449 || .364 || .523 || 3.9 || .2 || .2 || 1.3 || 3.9
|-
| style="text-align:left;"| 2018–19
| style="text-align:left;"| Georgia
| 32 || 32 || 31.6 || .460 || .281 || .641 || 8.6 || 1.8 || 1.1 || 2.5 || 13.0
|- class="sortbottom"
| style="text-align:center;" colspan="2"| Career
| 65 || 37 || 23.0 || .457 || .302 || .611 || 6.2 || 1.0 || .6 || 1.9 || 8.4

Personal life
Claxton is the son of Charles Claxton, a U.S. Virgin Islands native who played college basketball for Georgia and was briefly a member of the Boston Celtics in the 1995–96 NBA season. Nic's younger brother, Chase Claxton, plays Division I basketball for the Winthrop Eagles.

References

External links
Georgia Bulldogs bio

Living people
1999 births
American men's basketball players
American people of Virgin Islands descent
Basketball players from South Carolina
Brooklyn Nets draft picks
Brooklyn Nets players
Georgia Bulldogs basketball players
Long Island Nets players
Power forwards (basketball)
Sportspeople from Greenville, South Carolina
United States Virgin Islands men's basketball players